The 2022 African Amateur Boxing Championships was 20th men's edition and 5th women's edition African Amateur Boxing Championships. It took place in Maputo, Mozambique from 12 to 17 September 2022.

The competition saw the application of a new system for counting points, namely the scoring-machine, which counts all the medals won by teams, by granting each medal a certain number of points, Algeria became champions by teams with 41 pts.

Participating nations

Medal table 
 – Host nation (Mozambique)

Medalists

Draw sheets

M48 kg

M51 kg

M54 kg

M57 kg

M60 kg

M63.5 kg

M67 kg

M71 kg

M75 kg

M80 kg

M86 kg

M92 kg

M92+ kg

W48 kg

W50 kg

W52 kg

W54 kg

W57 kg

W60 kg

W63 kg

W66 kg

W70 kg

W75 kg

W81+ kg

References 

African Amateur Boxing Championships
African Amateur Boxing Championships
African Amateur Boxing Championships
African Amateur Boxing Championships
African Amateur Boxing Championships